Mahmudun Nabi (16 December 1936 – 20 December 1990) was a Bangladeshi playback singer. He was awarded Bangladesh National Film Award for Best Male Playback Singer for his performance in the film The Rain (1976).

Career
Nabi started his musical career in Bangladesh Betar in the 1960s.

Works
Notable songs
 "Kahin Ro Para Tabassum" film Jeena Bhi Mushqil (1966)
 "Hawa Dheere Behna" film Payal (with Sabina Yasmin)
 "Dekhe Keno Mone Hoy" film Kagojer Nouka (1966) (with Ferdausi Begum)
 "Tumi Kokhon Eshe Dariye Achho" film Abirbhab (1970)
 "Ami Saat Sagar Pari Diye" film Aalo Tumi Aleya
 "Boro Eka Eka Laage" film Deep Nebhe Nai (1968)
 "Premer Naam Bedona" film Neel Akasher Niche (1968)
 "Ki Anondo Diye" film Joar Bhata (1969) (with Sabina Yasmin)
 "Tumi Amay Bhalobasho" film Agontuk (1969)
 "Ami Je Kebol Bolei Choli" film Agontuk (1969) (with Shahnaz Begum)
 "Ei Sopnoghera Din Rakhbo Dhore" film Dorpochurno (1970) (with Kabori)
 "Tumi Je Amar Kobita" film Dorpochurno (1970) (with Sabina Yasmin)
 "O Meyer Naam Debo Ki" film Sorolipi (1970)
 "Ganeri Khatay Sorolipi Likhe" film Sorolipi (1970)
 "Ami To Aaj Bhule Gechhi" film The Rain (1976)
 "Tum Hi To Ho" film The Rain (1976)
 "Ke Jeno Aaj Amar Chokhe"

Film songs

Non-film songs

Personal life
Nabi had three daughters Fahmida Nabi, Tanzida Nabi and Samina Chowdhury and one son Ridwan Nabi Pancham. He died on 20 December 1990 and is buried in the Mohammadpur Graveyard at Taj Mahal Road, Mohammadpur, Dhaka.

References

External links
 

1936 births
1990 deaths
People from Bardhaman
20th-century Bangladeshi male singers
20th-century Bangladeshi singers
Bangladeshi playback singers
Best Male Playback Singer National Film Award (Bangladesh) winners
Place of death missing
Bangladeshi people of Indian descent
Singers from West Bengal